Are We Not Cats is a 2016 horror romance film written and directed by Xander Robin, about two strangers who spark romance through an unusual habit. The film stars Michael Patrick Nicholson, Chelsea Lopez, and Michael Godere.

The film premiered at the 73rd Venice International Film Festival and was listed as one of the top 10 horror films of 2018 by Rotten Tomatoes.

Synopsis 
After losing his job, girlfriend, and home in a single day, Eli, a desperate twenty-something accepts a delivery job in a remote upstate backwater. There he meets Anya, a beguiling young woman with whom he shares a strange habit. Eli's skin picking is reminiscent of Excoriation disorder and Trichotillomania, while Anya's hair picking is reminiscent of Trichotillomania and Trichophagia, leading to a climactic case of Rapunzel syndrome.

Cast
 Michael Patrick Nicholson as Eli
 Chelsea Lopez as Anya
 Michael Godere as Kyle
 Dean Holtermann as Al
 Charles Gould as Ari
 Adeline Thery as Madeline
 Alice Frank as Alice
 Tuffy Questell as Dennis
 Theodore Bouloukos as Dr. Mooney
 Carson Grant as Hawke
 Joe Buldo as Jack
 Ernst Zorin as Shvitzer Sam
 Marika Daciuk as Sonia
 Bill Weeden as Diner Dad
 Alex Goldberg as Max

Release 
The film had its world premiere at the 73rd Venice International Film Festival as the closing film of the Critics Week sidebar, and its U.S. premiere at the Chicago International Film Festival, as well as screening at 2016 Sitges Film Festival, 2016 Stockholm International Film Festival, 2016 Oldenburg International Film Festival and winning best narrative feature at the 2017 Sidewalk Film Festival. Are We Not Cats was released in North America in 2018 by Cleopatra Entertainment.

It was later released to stream on Shudder.

Reception 
The film holds a rating of 91% on Rotten Tomatoes based on 11 reviews.

References

External links 
 
 
 Are We Not Cats on Letterboxd
 Are We Not Cats on Rotten Tomatoes
 Are We Not Cats on Metacritic

2016 independent films
American independent films
American body horror films